Cuproxena amplana is a species of moth of the family Tortricidae. It is found in Napo Province, Ecuador.

The wingspan is 19-22.5 mm. The ground colour of the forewings is cream brown, but paler along the edges of the costal blotch and the termen. The suffusions and spots are brown. The hindwings are cream, tinged with orange on the periphery.

Etymology
The species name refers to the broad sacculus and is derived from Latin amplus (meaning large, ample).

References

Moths described in 2007
Cuproxena
Moths of South America
Taxa named by Józef Razowski